The 2005 Porsche Carrera Cup Deutschland season was the 20th German Porsche Carrera Cup season. It began on 17 April at Hockenheim and finished on 23 October at the same circuit, after seven rounds. It ran as a support championship for the 2005 DTM season. Christian Menzel won the championship by 12 points and finishing on the podium in all seven races. This season was also the last season along with quite a few of the other domestic championships that the 996 model was raced. It was replaced with the 997 model for the 2006 season after it was first introduced in the Porsche Supercup in the same year.

Teams and drivers

Race calendar and results

Championship standings

Drivers' championship

† — Drivers did not finish the race, but were classified as they completed over 90% of the race distance.

Teams' Championship

External links
The Porsche Carrera Cup Germany website
Porsche Carrera Cup Germany Online Magazine

Porsche Carrera Cup Germany seasons
Porsche Carrera Cup Germany